Nicholas of Lynn or Lynne, also known in Latin as Nicolas de Linna, was an English astronomer of the 14th century.

Life

Nicholas was apparently born in the Norfolk (UK) port town of King's Lynn (then "Bishop's Lynn"), possibly as early as 1330, although the confirmed details of his career suggest that a date closer to 1360 is more likely. According to early 16th century literary historian John Bale, he became a Carmelite friar and moved to the university town of Oxford, where he developed a great reputation for his scientific work. In 1386, at the request of the powerful lord John of Gaunt, he published a Kalendarium of detailed astronomical tables covering the years 1387–1462. It survives in sixteen manuscripts and one printed edition. Designed for use in the astrologically-based science of the time, the tables were very sophisticated, even including rules for synchronising medical treatment with astronomical cycles, such as the right phases of the moon for blood-letting. His contemporary Geoffrey Chaucer wrote very approvingly of Nicholas' work, and made much use of it. Nicholas was also supposedly an excellent musician. Later in life he moved to Cambridge, where he was promoted to subdeacon in 1410 and to deacon in 1411. The date of his death is unknown.

Reputation

What he was not, as far as any early biographers were concerned, was an explorer. The identification of Nicholas as the Franciscan (Minorite) friar who wrote a text called the Inventio Fortunata, allegedly describing a voyage to Greenland and beyond, was first proposed by Richard Hakluyt, the late 16th-century historian of exploration. Hakluyt based the claim on information from mathematician John Dee who, in turn, relied on information obtained from the Dutch cartographer Gerardus Mercator. Nicholas, however, was a Carmelite, not a Minorite, and if Hakluyt and Dee had read Bale (rather than apparently basing their identification on Chaucer's praise for Nicholas' work with astrolabes), they would have discovered an entry about a Franciscan friar named Hugh of Ireland, who wrote "a certain journey in one volume".

References

Further reading
 "The Kalendarium of Nicholas of Lynn" by Nicholas of Lynn, edited and introduced by Sigmund Eisner. University of Georgia Press, Athens, Georgia, 1980. 
 Sykes, Egerton. Nicolas of Lynn: The Explorer of the Arctic 1330–1390. Markham House, 1969. .

People from King's Lynn
14th-century English astronomers
15th-century English astronomers
14th-century English writers
14th-century Latin writers